Seviştiğimiz Günler is a 1961 Turkish romantic drama film, directed by Halit Refiğ and starring Orhan Günsiray, Fatma Girik, and Nilüfer Aydan.

References

External links
Seviştiğimiz Günler at the Internet Movie Database

1961 films
Turkish black-and-white films
Turkish romantic drama films
1961 romantic drama films
Films directed by Halit Refiğ